Dethridge is a surname. Notable people with the surname include:

George Dethridge (1863–1938), Australian judge
Kate Dethridge (born 1962), British educator
Rodney Dethridge (born 1961), British cricketer